High Peak is a local government district with borough status in Derbyshire, England. The borough compromises high moorland plateau in the Dark Peak area of the Peak District National Park. The district stretches from Holme Moss in the north to Sterndale Moor in the south, and from Hague Bar in the west to Bamford in the east. The population of the borough taken at the 2011 Census was 90,892. The borough is unusual in having two administrative centres for its council, High Peak Borough Council; the offices are based in both Buxton and Glossop. The borough also contains other towns including Chapel-en-le-Frith, Hadfield, New Mills and Whaley Bridge. 

High Peak was the name of a hundred of the ancient county of Derbyshire covering roughly the same area as the current district. It may have derived its name from the ancient Forest of High Peak, a royal hunting reserve administered by William Peverel, a favourite of William I, who was based at Peak Castle. High Peak contains much of the Peak District National Park. The district contains the highest point in Derbyshire, Kinder Scout, which stands at 636m (2,087 ft) above sea level. Its settlements act as commuter centres for people who work in the surrounding counties and other parts of Derbyshire itself; this is because of its central proximity to Cheshire, Greater Manchester, South Yorkshire, Staffordshire and West Yorkshire.

Creation
The borough was formed on 1 April 1974, covering the area of six former districts, which were abolished:
Buxton Municipal Borough
Chapel-en-le-Frith Rural District, 
Glossop Municipal Borough
New Mills Urban District 
Tintwistle Rural District (which had been in the administrative county of Cheshire)
Whaley Bridge Urban District

Neighbouring districts
The borough adjoins the metropolitan boroughs of Sheffield and Barnsley in South Yorkshire, Kirklees in West Yorkshire, the districts of Derbyshire Dales, Cheshire East and Staffordshire Moorlands and the Stockport, Tameside and Oldham metropolitan boroughs in Greater Manchester. The Metropolitan Borough of Oldham is only bordered by high moorland near Black Hill and is not accessible by road.

Main settlements
There are five main areas of settlement in the borough: around Buxton in the south west, around New Mills in the west, around Glossop in the north west, around Whaley Bridge and Chapel-en-le-Frith in the central part of the borough, and the Hope Valley in the east.  The northern part of the borough is close to the Manchester urban area. Some of the northern parts of High Peak were considered for inclusion in Greater Manchester. These areas have closer links to Stockport and Manchester than to settlements nearer Derby. Similarly, the villages of the Hope Valley are more closely linked to Sheffield and it has been considered whether these communities should be incorporated into that city.

Settlements in the borough include:

 Ashopton
 Bamford 
 Brough and Shatton
 Buxton 
 Buxworth
 Castleton 
 Chapel-en-le-Frith 
 Charlesworth
 Chinley 
 Chisworth 
 Crowden
 Derwent 
 Dove Holes
 Edale
 Fernilee
 Furness Vale
 Gamesley
 Glossop
 Hadfield
 Hayfield
 Hope
 Horwich End
 New Mills
 Old Glossop
 Padfield
 Peak Forest
 Peak Dale
 Rowarth
 Sparrowpit
 Taxal
 Tintwistle
 Thornhill
 Whaley Bridge
 Woodhead

National Trust
The National Trust is a major landowner in the district, owning extensive tracts of moorland and a number of farms, including some in Edale. Features of the Trust's High Peak Estate include Kinder Scout, Odin Mine and Mam Tor.

Freedom of the Borough
The following people and military units have received the Freedom of the Borough of High Peak.

Individuals
 John Pritchard: 15 November 2022.

Military Units
 The Worcestershire and Sherwood Foresters Regiment: 1974. 
 The Mercian Regiment: 18 December 2007.
 The Royal British Legion (6 Local Branches): 7 November 2018.

See also
High Peak Borough Council elections

References

 
Non-metropolitan districts of Derbyshire
Boroughs in England